Christoph Stangl (born 19 June 1978) is an Austrian judoka. He competed in the men's lightweight event at the 2000 Summer Olympics.

References

1978 births
Living people
Austrian male judoka
Olympic judoka of Austria
Judoka at the 2000 Summer Olympics
Sportspeople from Salzburg
21st-century Austrian people